Muriel Linsolas (born 24 September 1965 in Avignon) is a former French athlete, who specialized in the distance races.

Biography  
She won the French national title in the 10,000 meters in 1998 and the half-marathon in 1996 and 1997.

In 1996, during the IAAF World Half Marathon Championships at Palma, Spain, she won the silver medal in the team event alongside her compatriots Zahia Dahmani and Christine Mallo.

Prize list

Records

Notes and references

Sources 
 DocAthlé 2003 - Fédération française d'athlétisme - p. 417

External links  
 

1965 births
Living people
French female long-distance runners
Sportspeople from Avignon